Akiek may refer to:
The Akiek people
The Akiek language